Robert Leroy Smith (born March 10, 1955) is an American former professional basketball player and coach.

College career
A 5'11" tall point guard, Smith played college basketball at UNLV, where as a member of the fabled "Hardway Eight", that was coached by the legendary Jerry Tarkanian, and that took UNLV to its first NCAA Final Four, in 1977. His jersey was honored by UNLV in 2022.

Professional career
Smith was selected by the Denver Nuggets, in the third round of the 1977 NBA Draft, with the 65th overall draft pick. Smith played for seven NBA teams, in as many seasons from, 1977 to 1984. On November 17, 1978, while he was playing with the Denver Nuggets, Smith scored a career-high 19 points, in a game against the Boston Celtics.

In October 1979, Smith was traded by the Denver Nuggets to the Utah Jazz. In November 1979, he was signed as a free agent by the New Jersey Nets.

Coaching career
After he finished his pro club basketball playing career, Smith worked as a basketball coach at the AAU level. He coached at the Bill and Lilly Heinrich YMCA in Las Vegas, Nevada, along with his fellow UNLV teammate and lifelong friend, "Sudden" Sam Smith.

Personal life
Smith was born in Los Angeles, California. He suffered a stroke in 2019. He is still recovering.

References

External links
 NBA statistics @ basketballreference.com

1955 births
Living people
American expatriate basketball people in Canada
American expatriate basketball people in France
American men's basketball players
Arizona Western Matadors men's basketball players
AS Monaco Basket players
Basketball players from Los Angeles
Cleveland Cavaliers players
Denver Nuggets draft picks
Denver Nuggets players
Milwaukee Bucks players
Montana Golden Nuggets players
New Jersey Nets players
Olympique Antibes basketball players
Point guards
San Antonio Spurs players
San Diego Clippers players
Toronto Tornados players
UNLV Runnin' Rebels basketball players
Utah Jazz players